Alexandra Cristin (born April 12, 1989), is an American entrepreneur, plus size model, reality television personality, and the founder of Glam Seamless, based in New York City.

Personal life
Cristin was born on April 12, 1989, in Harrisburg, Pennsylvania, and was raised by a single mother. At the age of nine, she was accepted into a boarding school for children in poverty, called the Milton Hershey School. After graduating high school in 2007, she moved to New York City to become a plus size model and study business. In 2011, she graduated from Pace University. In the same year Cristin signed a modeling contract in New York City and established an e-commerce business, Glam Seamless.

Career
Cristin appeared on several reality TV shows throughout 2009–2016 on top networks, including NBC, E!, Oxygen, and TLC. Cristin transitioned her TV career into modeling where she signed a deal in New York City, landing modeling campaigns for several retailers including Old Navy, Dress Barn, and Ashley Stewart. After a successful career in TV and modeling, Cristin started an e-commerce business, Glam Seamless. Cristin started with $1,500 and grew the company to a seven figure business within two years, with no outside funding. Cristin has created a non profit organization; Glam Girls, that helps young girls in poverty to discover their inner strength and beauty. Cristin now owns several businesses including a plus size clothing line, a hair extensions manufacturing company, a YouTube channel and blog called Self Made Boss Babes, and is writing a book Pretty Ugly: The Reality of Success, which released at the end of 2020.

In 2018, Alexandra founded a nonprofit, Glam Girls, which works with young high school girls in low-income areas providing scholarships and mentorship.

In 2019, her business Glam Seamless was acquired by Beauty Industry Group.

Recognition 
In April 2017, Cristin was listed on Inc. Magazine's 30 under 30 list.

References

Living people
1989 births
Plus-size models
Female models from New York (state)
Participants in American reality television series
21st-century American women